LOLwork is an American reality documentary television series on the Bravo. The series premiered on November 7, 2012.

Premise
The series follows Ben Huh and his staff at Cheezburger, located in downtown Seattle, as they create a new comedic web series for their site.

Cast

 Alison 'Ali' Luhrs
 Alison 'Monda'
 Ben Huh
 Emily Huh
 Forest Gibson
 Paul Gude
 Todd Sawicki
 Sarah Hiraki
 Tori Wadzita
 William 'Will' Sharick

Episodes

References

2010s American reality television series
2012 American television series debuts
2012 American television series endings
English-language television shows
Bravo (American TV network) original programming